Hunan embroidery, or Xiang embroidery, as one of the traditional folk arts of China, together with Cantonese embroidery, Sichuan embroidery and Suzhou embroidery, is regarded as the four most distinguished embroidery styles in China.  It is a general name for the embroidery products which rise from and are mostly produced at Changsha, Hunan, with distinct characteristics of Chu culture. Hunan embroidery is particularly famous in embroidering with silk thread, and the patterns have a high sense of reality. In 2006, Hunan embroidery was selected into the first batch of national intangible cultural heritage list.

History
According to the embroidery unearthed from Chu tomb in 1958 in Changsha, Hunan, a conclusion can be drawn that the embroidery technology had developed to certain extent in some local places of Hunan early back to the Spring and Autumn period, existing in over two thousand five hundred years ago. The forty pieces of embroidered garments excavated from Mawangdui Han Tomb in Changsha in 1972, have also evidenced the excellence of the embroidery technology boomed in local places of Hunan during the Western Han Dynasty some two thousand and a hundred years ago. In the long developing course afterwards, Xiang Embroidery gradually cultivated its simple and graceful style.

In the 24th year of Emperor Gangxu's reign (1898), Wu Hancheng, son of the embroiderer Hu Lianxian, established in Changsha the first embroidery workshop, named “Wu Caixia Embroidery Workshop” and with its products produced and marketed all by itself. And thanks to the embroideries produced there, Xiang embroidery was widely spread and made its name throughout the nation. At the end of Guangxu period, the folk art of Xiang Embroidery developed a particular embroidery system and became the incubator of market-oriented handicrafts with strong local characteristics of Hunan area different from other types of embroidery. Since then, the term “Xiang Embroidery” has been born and widely used.

The book of Changsha County written in the Tongzhi period of late Qing Dynasty, said, “In the provincial capital, women prefer embroidering to spinning, and the powerful or rich families highly praise and give great honor to embroidery.” Changsha County is the traditional base of Xiang embroidery with the name of “Home of Xiang Embroidery”, where the majority of peasant women work in embroidery. By the end of Qing Dynasty, the number of embroidery workshops had increased to 26 in Changsha County, the embroidery craftsmen had reached tens of thousands of people and the annual output of embroideries exceeded 20 thousand pieces, among which the bulk are used as daily necessities such as the quilt sheet or the pillowcase and the minority are exquisite and high quality screen covers.

In the 1930s, the highest production value of Xiang Embroidery can reach up to 800 thousand silver dollars, and one third of it is exported abroad. During decades after liberation, Xiang Embroidery had achieved remarkable progress and been put into the list of “the four famous Chinese embroideries”, attributing to its unique style and superb embroidery technology. What’s more, it has also become the art name card of Hunan province or even the nation, with an annual total export of 5 million US dollars.

Characteristics
The proficient manipulation of different shades of grey, black and white and the natural chiaroscuro in Xiang Embroidery both enhance its texture and stereoscopic effect; the combination of the void and the solid in its structure makes a good use of emptiness on the embroidery cloth, thus highlighting the subject. In addition, borrowing skills of traditional painting, Xiang Embroidery has also given full play to the embroidery technology. Therefore, it finally forms a realistic, bright and simple style strongly affected by the local culture of Hunan and has the simplicity and elegance of Chinese wash painting on the other hand.

Thread
Xiang embroidery uses pure silk, hard satin, soft satin, transparent gauze and nylon as its materials as well as a variety of colorful silk threads. Traditional Xiang Embroidery uses threads in a very distinctive way—the thread is firstly boiled with Gleditsia and then wiped with bamboo paper, which prevents the thread from pilling and thus is convenient for embroidering. In Xiang Embroidery, there is a special type of thread—in one thread dyed one color with different shades of that color, by which the sfumato effect can be presented after the embroidering finished. In addition, Xiang Embroidery is also renowned for its careful thread splitting technique, making the thread as thin as hair. And people call the embroidery using this kind of thread “Yang Mao Xi Xiu”.

Stitch
There are 72 types of stitches in traditional Xiang Embroidery including You stitch, Mao stitch, Peng hair stitch, Qi stitch, Ping stitch(flatting stitch), Wang stitch, Dazi stitch, random stitch and Gold Wire stitch, etc. and they can be divided into five major types: flat embroidery, brocade embroidery, mesh embroidery, twist embroidery and knot embroidery.

Subject
In Xiang Embroidery, Landscape, animals and characters are common subjects, and the peonies, tigers, cats, dogs and dragons are the most representative designs characterized by rich changes in the layering of the colors and the high sense of painting. Embroidering landscape is relatively easier than embroidering animals, but characters are the most difficult ones to embroider with its higher requirements for the density of the thread, furthermore, it’s not easy to capture the characters’expression.

The expression “Su Embroidery’s cats and Xiang Embroidery’s tigers” circulated in the folk is a high praise for the excellence of Su Embroidery in embroidering the animal cats and Xaing Embroidery in tigers.

Use
Xiang embroidery crafts include valuable works of art, as well as materials for daily use, such as screens, quilt sheets, pillowcases, back cushions, tablecloths, handkerchiefs, embroidered shoes, etc.

Achievements
Xiang Embroidery attracts people both at home and abroad. Xiang Embroidery was praised “the threads have flawlessly and fluently covered the sketches”at the Nanyang Industrial Exposition in Nanjing In 1910. In 1915, Xiang Embroidery works won 4 more medals at the Panama Expo held in San Francisco, America. In the 1930s, the portrait of Franklin D. Roosevelt embroidered by the Xiang Embroidery artist, Yang Peizhen, was sent as a personal present to President Roosevelt and is still now being showcased in the “Little White House” museum, an exhibition for the life story of Franklin D. Roosevelt, in Atlanta, Georgia, in the southeast of the US.

Inheriting the traditional embroidery craftsmanship, Xiang Embroidery has made another breakthrough and created a sophisticated new type of embroidery: the Double-sided disparate embroidery, that is, in one piece of cloth, while one side of the embroidery is finished, the other side is simultaneously completed but with different colors or designs. In that sense, there is no such a thing as the obverse side or the reverse side since both sides depict a thing. The representative splendid works of this type have Lady Yang, Hua Mulan, Viewing the Moon

Because of continuous dedication to Xiang Embroidery, Xiang Embroidery has moved towards a decorative art and collection art from the practical art of living, and is often chosen as good presents which indicate the workmanship level and carry the culture of the place creates it.

Exhibition
To protect and inherit the national intangible cultural heritage and revitalize the Xiang embroidery industry, Mr. Mao yongzhen, the chairman of TianLi Xiang Embroidery Co. Limited, established the Shaping Xiang Embroidery Museum in Hunan. It is conferred “the first batch of civilian-run museums in Hunan” by the Hunan Provincial Administration of Cultural Heritage, that is, it is the first private supporting museum for the Xiang Embroidery industry in Huan. The establishment of the museum was planned in 2006 and wasn’t completed until 2010. Its predecessor was WuyiRoad TianLi Xiang Embroidery Art Gallery. The museum has now been rebuilt on the northwest corner of Xiang Embroidery Cultural Square and has been open to the public since May 18, 2010.

See also
Embroidery City

References

Chinese embroidery
Culture in Hunan